The governing body of swimming in the UK, British Swimming (organisation), organises annual British Championships in swimming. The event is usually held in March or April each year in a long course (50 m) swimming pool, with the results usually acting as selection trials for upcoming international level competitions due to be held in the following summer season.

This is a list of the British champions in the events held at these annual championships. The event remains 'Open' which has resulted in many swimmers of various nationalities claiming the title over the years.

Venues and dates
For venues and dates see British Swimming Championships.

Champions by event

50 m freestyle

100 m freestyle

200 m freestyle

400 m freestyle

800 m freestyle

1500 m freestyle

5000 m freestyle

50 m backstroke

100 m backstroke

200 m backstroke

50 m breaststroke

100 m breaststroke

200 m breaststroke

50 m butterfly

100 m butterfly

200 m butterfly

200 m individual medley

400 m individual medley

See also
British Swimming

References

Swimming in the United Kingdom
Lists of swimming medalists